The 2017 season was São Paulo's 88th year since the club's existence. At the beginning of this year São Paulo had as a featured the return of retired goalkeeper Rogerio Ceni, the owner of record numbers in Tricolor´s history such as 1,237 matches and 131 goals in 23 years. Ceni was hired as head coach just a year after retirement, and during his time off the former player spent his time studying technical fundamentals of football management in some clubs of Europe like Liverpool and Sevilla. In the first activity by São Paulo, the newly coach earned a preseason friendly tournament in Florida after two wins in penalty shootout, the final match was played against rivals Corinthians and game ended in 0-0 (4-3 in penalties). Although the victorious beginning the ex-goalkeeper remained only 6 months in charge reaching a 50% performance of points acquired by official competitive matches, Ceni take group to semi-finals being eliminated by Corinthians after two legs. In national cup, Copa do Brasil, São Paulo disputed until fourth round when was defeated by Cruzeiro in aggregated score 2-3 (0-2 home; 2-1 away). Third setback in a short period of one month came against newcomer Argentine club in international competitions, Defensa y Justicia, who stopped The Dearest doing a double equal results and scoring a single goal in Morumbi Stadium, fact that led them to next stage (0-0 away; 1-1 home). Lastly Ceni managed in first eleven rounds of Série A (national league) being fired due its positioning in table as 17th place, first round that Tricolor appeared in relegation zone. The charge was occupied by former goalkeeper until July 3 after 35 official matches and replaced by Dorival Júnior, previous head coach from one of biggest rivals Santos FC. Dorival had commanded the seashore club over 120 games with an expressive percentage of points approximately 64% got in two times. Although there has been a change, team kept an irregular performance in the course of league fighting against relegation in most of rounds and being 14 rounds between the last four positions. Around 10 matches before the end of season, The Dearest improved his campaign being one of the best clubs in the second half of championship. Never before São Paulo was relegated in whole history of Campeonato Brasileiro Era since 1971 but took a negative record of most rounds ended in relegation zone, more than 2013 when spent 11 rounds there.

Players

Current squad

Transfers

In

Out

Statistics

Appearances and goals

|-
|colspan="14" style="text-align:center;" |Players who are on loan/left São Paulo this season:

|}

Top scorers

Managers performance

Overview

{|class="wikitable"
|-
|Games played || 62 (16 Campeonato Paulista, 6 Copa do Brasil, 2 Copa Sudamericana, 38 Campeonato Brasileiro)
|-
|Games won || 24 (7 Campeonato Paulista, 4 Copa do Brasil, 0 Copa Sudamericana, 13 Campeonato Brasileiro)
|-
|Games drawn || 20 (6 Campeonato Paulista, 1 Copa do Brasil, 2 Copa Sudamericana, 11 Campeonato Brasileiro)
|-
|Games lost || 18 (3 Campeonato Paulista, 1 Copa do Brasil, 0 Copa Sudamericana, 14 Campeonato Brasileiro)
|-
|Goals scored || 93
|-
|Goals conceded || 80
|-
|Goal difference || +13
|-
|Best result || 5−0 (H) v Linense − Campeonato Paulista
|-
|Worst result || 0−3 (A) v Palmeiras − Campeonato Paulista
|-
|Top scorer || Lucas Pratto (14)
|-

Friendlies

Florida Cup

Official competitions

Campeonato Paulista

Group B

First stage

Quarter-finals

Semi-finals

Copa do Brasil

First round

Second round

Third round

Fourth round

Copa Sudamericana

First stage

Campeonato Brasileiro Série A

Results summary

Results by round

References

External links
official website

São Paulo FC seasons
Sao Paulo